Run for Money is a 1999 Turkish film directed by Reha Erdem. It was Turkey's submission to the 73rd Academy Awards for the Academy Award for Best Foreign Language Film, but was not accepted as a nominee.

Cast 
 Taner Birsel - Selim
 Bennu Yıldırımlar - Ayla
 Zuhal Gencer - Nihal
 Engin Alkan - Ahmet

See also

Cinema of Turkey
List of submissions to the 73rd Academy Awards for Best Foreign Language Film

References

External links

1999 films
1990s Turkish-language films
1999 comedy-drama films
Films set in Turkey
Turkish black comedy films
1990s black comedy films
Turkish comedy-drama films